The Europe/Africa Zone was one of the three zones of the regional Davis Cup competition in 1999.

In the Europe/Africa Zone there were four different tiers, called groups, in which teams competed against each other to advance to the upper tier. The top two teams in each Group IV sub-zone advanced to the Europe/Africa Zone Group III in 2000. All other teams remained in Group IV.

Participating nations

Draw
 Venue: Accra Sports Stadium, Accra, Ghana
 Date: 18–22 May

Zone A

Zone B

Zone A

Malta vs. Iceland

Cyprus vs. Sudan

Cyprus vs. Ethiopia

Iceland vs. Sudan

Malta vs. Sudan

Ethiopia vs. Iceland

Malta vs. Ethiopia

Cyprus vs. Iceland

Malta vs. Cyprus

Ethiopia vs. Sudan

Zone B

Azerbaijan vs. San Marino

Madagascar vs. Uganda

Azerbaijan vs. Uganda

Botswana vs. San Marino

Azerbaijan vs. Madagascar

Botswana vs. Uganda

Botswana vs. Madagascar

San Marino vs. Uganda

Azerbaijan vs. Botswana

Madagascar vs. San Marino

References

External links
Davis Cup official website

Davis Cup Europe/Africa Zone
Europe Africa Zone Group IV